Fayetteville Historic District may refer to:

Fayetteville Downtown Historic District, Fayetteville, North Carolina, listed on the NRHP in Cumberland County, North Carolina
Fayetteville Street Historic District, Raleigh, NC, listed on the NRHP in North Carolina
Fayetteville Historic District (Fayetteville, Texas), listed on the National Register of Historic Places in Fayette County, Texas
Fayetteville Historic District (Fayetteville, West Virginia), listed on the National Register of Historic Places in Fayette County, West Virginia